Boyer is an unincorporated community located in Sunflower County, Mississippi.

Cemetery

Boyer Cemetery is a historical cemetery located in Boyer. The cemetery is located on Steiner-Boyer Road in Boyer, Mississippi. The Boyer Cemetery dates back to the early 19th century in the early years of Mississippi being a state and is marked by a historical marker.

References

Unincorporated communities in Sunflower County, Mississippi
Unincorporated communities in Mississippi